Ondřej Synek (born 13 October 1982 in Stará Boleslav) is a former Czech rower. He is a five-times World Champion in Single Sculls, winning in 2010, 2013, 2014, 2015 and 2017. He won Olympic silver medals at the 2008 Summer Olympics in Beijing and 2012 Summer Olympics in London.  In Beijing he came in as the chief rival of Mahé Drysdale, but despite Drysdale coming down with a painful stomach flu and falling in the final stages of the final to bronze, he was upset for the gold by defending Olympic Champion Olaf Tufte, who Synek had regularly been beating the previous couple years.  In London he came in co favored for gold with Drysdale after trading gold and silver at the previous 2 World Championships, but fell short to Drysdale in the final.

In Rio after having won 3 straight World Championships since London, he came in as the clear favorite and had a stated desire to badly want the Olympic Gold he narrowly missed in both Beijing and London   his quest for Olympic Gold failed for a 3rd consecutive time in Rio as he took bronze in the single sculls behind both Drysdale and the surprising Damir Martin.   As a 5 time World Champion in single sculls, and with a total of 13 World and Olympic single scull medals he is by far the most successful single sculler in history to not yet have an Olympic Gold.   He confirmed after his Rio defeat to want to take a likely final attempt at the elusive Olympic gold medal in Tokyo 2020, but in June 2021 he announced on his Facebook page that he will not be going to Tokyo. In September 2021 Synek announced end of his career.

References

1982 births
Living people
People from Brandýs nad Labem-Stará Boleslav
Czech male rowers
Rowers at the 2004 Summer Olympics
Rowers at the 2008 Summer Olympics
Rowers at the 2012 Summer Olympics
Rowers at the 2016 Summer Olympics
Olympic rowers of the Czech Republic
Olympic silver medalists for the Czech Republic
Olympic bronze medalists for the Czech Republic
Olympic medalists in rowing
Medalists at the 2012 Summer Olympics
Medalists at the 2008 Summer Olympics
Medalists at the 2016 Summer Olympics
World Rowing Championships medalists for the Czech Republic
Sportspeople from the Central Bohemian Region